Anant Darshan Shankar, born in Bombay in the state of Maharashtra.  His core areas of interest are educational innovation and theoretical foundations of Indian medical heritage. He is the founder of the Foundation for Revitalization of Local Health Traditions, which is a Government of India accredited scientific and research organization mandated to revitalize the medical heritage of India. He has also founded the Trans-disciplinary University, Bangalore. He is the first Indian to receive the Columbia University Award from Rosenthal Centre of Columbia University and College of Physicians and Surgeons, New York, in 2003. The Government of India honored Shankar in 2011, with the fourth highest civilian award of Padma Shri.

See also
 Foundation for Revitalization of Local Health Traditions

References

External links
 

Living people
Recipients of the Padma Shri in public affairs
People from Shimoga
Indian medical researchers
Indian health activists
Year of birth missing (living people)